Paul Kenny (born 16 July 1951) is a British artist/photographer who makes abstract still-life images and lives in Berwick-upon-Tweed. He has published the books Seaworks (2014) and O Hanami (2019). His work is held in the Scottish National Photography Collection and he has had solo exhibitions at Harris Museum, Art Gallery in Preston and at Atkinson Art Gallery and Library in Southport.

Early life and education
Kenny was born and grew up in Salford. He earned a Pre Diploma from Salford College of Art and Technology (1971/72) and a Degree in Fine Art from Newcastle University (1972–75).

Work
"Working without a camera, Kenny creates small plates or slides laden with objects found on his wanderings – leaves, flowers, shells and rocks. Each plate is then scanned to produce abstract large-scale photographs rich with opalescent colours, which take on the form of imagined landscapes."

Personal life
Kenny's partner, Margaret Kenny, is also an artist and they have two children.

Publications
Seaworks: 1998–2013. Triplekite, 2014. .
O Hanami: the Celebration of Transient Beauty. Kozu, 2019. With a foreword by Francis Hodgson.

Collections
Kenny's work is held in the following permanent collection:
Scottish National Photography Collection, Scottish National Portrait Gallery / National Galleries of Scotland, Edinburgh: 22 works (as of July 2021)

Exhibitions

Solo exhibitions
Harris Museum, Art Gallery, Preston, UK, 2001
Paul Kenny: Seaworks, Atkinson Art Gallery and Library, Southport, 2021

Group exhibitions
Expect the Unexpected, The Lowry, Salford, 2019. With work by Kenny, Mark Bloomfield, Greig Burgoyne, Joel Goodman, Yoko Ono, Eugenie Scrase, Sarah Sze, Merel Theloesen, Keith Tyson, and Gillian Wearing.

References

External links

21st-century British photographers
Fine art photographers
People from Salford
Alumni of Newcastle University
Living people
1951 births